Kherson Raion is a raion (district) of Kherson Oblast, Ukraine. It was created in July 2020 as part of the reform of administrative divisions of Ukraine. The center of the raion is the city of Kherson. Two abolished raions, Bilozerka and Oleshky Raions, as well as Kherson Municipality, were merged into Kherson Raion. Population:

Subdivisions
At the time of establishment in 2020, the Kherson administrative district was subdivided into 10 hromadas:
 Bilozerka settlement hromada with the administration in the urban-type settlement of Bilozerka, transferred from Bilozerka Raion;
 Chornobaivka rural hromada with the administration in the village of Chornobaivka, transferred from Bilozerka Raion;
 Darivka rural hromada with the administration in the village of Darivka, transferred from Bilozerka Raion;
 Kherson urban hromada, with the administration in the city of Kherson, transferred from Kherson Municipality;
 Muzykivka rural hromada with the administration in the village of Muzykivka, transferred from Bilozerka Raion;
 Oleshky urban hromada with the administration in the city of Oleshky, transferred from Oleshky Raion;
 Stanislav rural hromada with the administration in the village of Stanislav, transferred from Bilozerka Raion;
 Velyki Kopani rural hromada with the administration in the village of Velyki Kopani, transferred from Oleshky Raion;
 Vynohradove rural hromada with the administration in the village of Vynohradove, transferred from Oleshky Raion;
 Yuvileine rural hromada with the administration in the settlement of Yuvileine, transferred from Oleshky Raion.

References

Raions of Kherson Oblast
Ukrainian raions established during the 2020 administrative reform